The Manor in Rataje  is a dwór (manor house) in Rataje, Poland which was built in the 19th century. It is a symmetrical single-floor building built in the style of minimalism. The building has a tympanum in pseudobaroque style and a wood porch. Currently the roof is covered with asphalt. It is surrounded by a landscaped park with an area of about 8 hectares. A short avenue of chestnut trees runs to the manor. On the west side of the park is a wooden granary, which is a remnant of the farm. Currently it is the youth club, and a library.

Gallery

Bibliography
 Pałac w Ratajach może przejść w prywatne ręce
 

Manor houses in Poland
Gmina Września